Deel is a privately-held payroll and compliance provider based in San Francisco, California. The company provides hiring and payments services for companies hiring international employees and contractors.

History 
Deel was founded in 2018 by Alex Bouaziz and Shuo Wang, who met while studying at MIT in 2013. The founders had encountered difficulty hiring international workers affordably while bootstrapping their own businesses. Deel entered the Y Combinator startup accelerator in 2019. Its initial product allowed companies to hire contractors only.

In May 2020, venture capital firm Andreessen Horowitz led a $14 million Series A round. CNBC reported that the round was conducted entirely using videoconferencing software. In September 2020 the company then raised an additional $48 million in a Series B led by Spark Capital. Forbes attributed the growth to the increasing adoption of remote work due to the coronavirus pandemic.

In April 2021, Deel raised $156 million in a Series C round, becoming a unicorn. The investment was led by Y Combinator's YC Continuity Fund, Andreessen Horowitz, and Spark Capital. The company acquired Zeitgold, a German-based payroll automation provider in August 2021 for an undisclosed amount. In October 2021 Deel raised $425 million in a Series D round led by Coatue at a $5.5 billion valuation. In May 2022 Deel raised a $50 million round at a $12 billion valuation from investors including Emerson Collective

In June 2022 Deel offered to acquire PayGroup, a public Australian payroll company.

Products 
The company offers a central platform for companies to hire employees and independent contractors located remotely. Deel hires employees through their own local entity on a company's behalf, acting as the employer of record and managing compliance with employment laws in each country. As of August 2021, it owned 45 entities.

The company processes international payroll, with a range of withdrawal options in multiple currencies, including Coinbase, PayPal, Payoneer, Revolut, and bank transfer. It reported that about 2% of its users withdrew funds in cryptocurrency in 2021.

Deel assists with creating contracts that comply with local labor laws using localized templates. It also helps workers access insurance options for health.

The company partnered with the United Arab Emirates government to expedite visas for foreign workers.

Operations 
Deel is headquartered in San Francisco, California. As of January 2023, it reported having 2000 employees. The company operates completely remotely.

References 

Software companies of the United States
Privately held companies of the United States
Software companies established in 2018
Payroll
Y Combinator companies
Technology companies based in the San Francisco Bay Area